Sariakandi Upazila is an upazila of Bogra District in the Division of Rajshahi, Bangladesh.
Sariakandi Thana was established in 1886 and was converted into an upazila in 1983. It is named after its administrative center, the town of Sariakandi.

Geography
About three-fifths is land and two-fifths is water, chiefly the Jamuna River, which flows south through the upazila. It is the easternmost upazila of Bogra District. It borders Sonatala Upazila to the west and north, Rangpur Division to the north, Dhaka Division to the east, Sirajganj District to the southeast, Dhunat Upazila to the south, and Gabtali Upazila to the west.

Demographics

According to the 2011 Bangladesh census, Sariakandi Upazila had 75,614 households and a population of 270,719, 6.8% of whom lived in urban areas. 11.1% of the population was under the age of 5. The literacy rate (age 7 and over) was 36.9%, compared to the national average of 51.8%.

Administration
Sariakandi Upazila is divided into Sariakandi Municipality and 12 union parishads: Bhelabari, Bohail, Chaluabari, Chandan Baisha, Fulbari, Hat Sherpur, Kamalpur, Karnibari, Kazla, Kutubpur, Narchi, and Sariakandi. The union parishads are subdivided into 100 mauzas and 173 villages.

Sariakandi Municipality is subdivided into 9 wards and 17 mahallas.

Education

There are five colleges in the upazila. They include Chandan Baisha Degree College, founded in 1964, Chhaihata Degree College, and Shariakandi Degree College.

Jamthol Technical Management College, founded in 2001, is one of the upazila's two colleges in the technical and vocational education system.

The madrasa education system includes three fazil madrasas.

Anushilon pre-cadet & high school founded in 2000 is one of the best kindergarten school for its curiculam, activities  & result.

See also
Upazilas of Bangladesh
Districts of Bangladesh
Divisions of Bangladesh

References

Upazilas of Bogra District